2005–06 was the seventh season that Division 1 functioned as the third-level of ice hockey in Sweden, below the second-level HockeyAllsvenskan and the top-level Elitserien (now the SHL).

Format 
The league was divided into six regional groups. In each region, the top teams qualified for the playoffs, from which the winners advanced to the Kvalserien till HockeyAllsvenskan, for the opportunity to be promoted to the HockeyAllsvenskan. The bottom teams in each group were forced to play in a relegation round against the top teams from Division 2 in order to retain their spot in Division 1 for the following season. These were also conducted within each region.

First round

Division 1A

Placing round 1A

Division 1B

Placing round 1B

Division 1C

Division 1D

Division 1E

Division 1F

Playoffs

Final round A/B

Playoffs C/D

Semifinals 
 Valbo AIF - Huddinge IK 0:2 (1:6, 2:5)
 Väsby IK - Borlänge HF 1:2 (5:2, 1:4, 1:4)

Final 
 Huddinge IK - Borlänge HF 2:1 (3:0, 2:3 OT, 6:1)

Playoffs E/F

Semifinals 
 Örebro HK - Tingsryds AIF 2:1 (2:5, 3:1, 3:2 OT)
 IK Pantern - Mariestads BoIS 1:2 (0:6, 5:3, 2:9)

Final 
 Örebro HK - Mariestads BoIS 0:2 (1:2, 2:3 OT)

Relegation

Division 1B

Division 1C

Division 1D

Division 1E

Division 1F

External links 
 Season on hockeyarchives.info

3
Swedish Division I seasons